NGC 4701 is an unbarred spiral galaxy in the New General Catalogue, located in the constellation Virgo. It was discovered by the English astronomer William Herschel in 1786 with a 47.5 cm (18.7 inch) diameter mirror type telescope. It is a member of the Virgo II Groups, a series of galaxies and galaxy clusters strung out from the southern edge of the Virgo Supercluster.

References

External links 
 

07975
4701
Virgo (constellation)
Unbarred spiral galaxies
043331